Protamine 1 is a protein that in humans is encoded by the PRM1 gene.

References

Further reading